Phước Sơn Temple (Chùa Phước Sơn,  or ) is a historic 19th-century temple in Phú Yên Province in south central Vietnam. It was initially built in 1802.

References

Buddhist temples in Vietnam
Buildings and structures in Phú Yên province